Le Val may refer to the following places in France: 

Le Val, Doubs, a commune in the Doubs department
Le Val, Var, a commune in the Var department

See also
Le VAL (V%C3%A9hicule Automatique L%C3%A9ger), a driverless people mover
 Leval (disambiguation)